Henderson Independent School District is a public school district based in Henderson, Texas (USA).

History
Later in 1949, HISD began absorbing other area school districts. Motley, New Hope, Crim’s Chapel, Grandview, Roquemore, Oakland, Ebenezer, and Bethel were the first communities merged into Henderson ISD. Hickey joined the district in 1950 and Pinehill joined the district in 1951. The district constructed a new Henderson High School building in 1953 due to the increased demand for a school building due to the new students coming from the consolidations.

In 2009, the school district was rated "academically acceptable" by the Texas Education Agency.

In 2010, the Henderson Lion football team won the Texas 3-A Division 1 State Championship by defeating the Chapel Hill Bulldogs at Cowboys Stadium (AT&T Stadium) in Arlington, Texas.

Henderson High School's marching band became the 2012 3A state champions at the National Association of Military Marching Bands contest held in Bryan, Texas.

In 2013, voters approved the funding of a new middle school to be built in the same location as the old one. The 6th grade building will still be used but the 7th, and 8th grade buildings will be torn down and rebuilt on the middle schools practice field. Construction has not started as of March 23, 2014.

The Henderson High School Marching Band became the 2015 State Champions at the National Association of Military Marching Bands contest held in Carthage, Texas.

Schools
 Henderson High School (grades 9–12)
 Henderson Middle School (grades 6–8)
 The campus occupies a former building of Henderson High School, which was completed in 1953. In 1979 the high school moved to its current location, and Henderson Middle moved into the former high school building. A wing for science classes and sixth grade classes opened in 1997. In 2006 the gymnasium was renovated. The school was revamped once again in 2015, with a complete remodeling of the building and an extreme renovation of the football stadium. The new middle school, holding the same title, opened in November 2015.
 Northside Intermediate School (grades 4–5)
 William E. Wylie Elementary School (grades 1–3)
 Monnie Meyer Wylie Primary School (PreK-K)

External links

Henderson ISD

References

School districts in Rusk County, Texas